Sankt Aegyd am Neuwalde is a market town in the district of Lilienfeld, Lower Austria.

Geography
St. Aegyd is divided into the districts of Kernhof, Lahnsattel, Mitterbach, St. Aegyd am Neuwalde, and Ulreichsberg. The town is located in the Mostviertel.  87.61 percent of municipal territory is forested.

History
In antiquity, the territory that is now St. Aegyd was part of the Roman province of Noricum. As part of the Austrian heartland of Lower Austria, St. Aegyd was part of the tumultuous  history of Austria.

Population

Politics
St. Aegyd am Neuwalde's mayor is Herbert Mitterböck and its chief officer is Adolf Praschl. In the municipal council, the mandates for its 21 seats are distributed as follows: SPÖ 13, ÖVP 6, FPÖ 2, others 0.

References

The information in this article is based on a translation of its German equivalent.

Sankt Aegyd am Neuwalde